A list of fish of Jamaica.

Jamaican waters contain maccaback and saltwater fish.

Saltwater
The chief varieties of saltwater fish include:
Kingfish
Jack
Mackerel
Whiting
Bonito
Tuna
Barracuda

Estuarine
Fish that occasionally enter freshwater and estuarine environments include:
Snook
Jewfish
Mangrove snapper
Mullet

Freshwater
Fish that spend the majority of their lives in Jamaica's fresh waters include many species of:
Livebearers
Killifish
Gobies
Perch

Introduced

Intentional
The Malagasy mountain mullet, American Eel and Tilapia have been introduced from Africa for aquaculture and are very common.

Accidental
Lion fish
Fresh water fish 
Parrot fish

References

 
F